Pogorelovo is a rural locality (a village) and the administrative center of Pogorelovskoye Rural Settlement, Totemsky District, Vologda Oblast, Russia. The population was 388 as of 2002. There are 7 streets.

Geography 
Pogorelovo is located 56 km southwest of Totma (the district's administrative centre) by road. Boyarskoye is the nearest rural locality.

References 

Rural localities in Totemsky District